Born in the second half of the 1970s and developed in the 1980s, power dressing is a fashion style that enables women to establish their authority in a professional and political environment traditionally dominated by men.

History
The term power dressing relates to a fashion style typical of the business and politics environment of the 1970s and 1980s. Today, the expression "power dressing" is no longer commonly used, but the style is still popular. Power dressing arose in the United States in the second half of the 1970s. Power dressing could be analyzed through visual sociology, which studies how fashion operates in the relationship between social systems and the negotiation of power.

The concept of power dressing was brought to popularity by John T. Molloy's manuals Dress for success (1975) and Women: dress for success (1977), which suggest a gender specific professional dress code. Molloy's manuals addressed a new kind of female workers entering in a typical masculine environment recommending the skirted suit as a "uniform" that would help them to acquire authority, respect and power at work.

Features
Initially power dressing consisted in a conservative style recalling directly the male wardrobe including tailored suits, jackets with padded shoulders, roll-neck sweaters and knee length skirts. With the power dressing uniform, the female body was divided in two parts: The upper part covered by a jacket to de-emphasize breasts, the bottom covered with a skirt that was a reminder of femininity.
These outfits were usually matched with feminine accessories such as silk scarves and discreet pieces of jewelry like brooches and pearl necklaces. Elaborate patterns such as floral prints were rejected in favor of pinstripes, houndstooth, and plaids. As far as colors were concerned, sober, neutral shades such as blue, black, navy, and grey were commonly preferred to bright or pastel colors ones like purple, red, and pink.

Origins
The origins of power dressing can be found in the Chanel suit of the 1920s. The Chanel suit was composed by a tight skirt and by a wool, collarless button-up jacket, usually with braid trim, metallic buttons and fitted sleeves.

This suit represented a turning point in the way women dressed. In fact, it was the very first professional suit specifically thought for women, which enabled them to look modern and feminine while feeling comfortable. It included traditionally masculine elements which gave women a very authoritative appearance, but at the same time it left space for a refined and sophisticated look. The most important innovation of the Chanel suit was that it was deliberately designed to adapt to the changing lifestyle of women that, during and after World War I, were slowly entering previously all-male environments. This suit encouraged women to try to reach their professional goals giving them comfort and mobility to fit with their independent and active lifestyles. According to the costume historian Harold Koda the Chanel suit allowed women of the time to de-sex their feminine look and to have a more masculine appearance in order to be accepted as equals in the professional sphere.

Evolution
It was only when enough women were clearly established as authoritative in the work environment, that it was possible to renovate the women's suit: no more feminized imitations of men's professional garments but suit different in fabric, cut, color and ornament, helping women to show both their authority and their femininity. Wearing a suit did not represent an effort to blend in with men but an effort to stand out and define a clear visual presence.
In fact, it was only in the second half of the 1980s that more feminine garments were introduced in the "power uniform". For instance blouses were worn with intricate cravat effect neck wrappings, made up in silk or polyester satin foulard.

Social meaning
Power dressing discourse was significant in building a new type of  working woman appearing in the society at the time. The notion of career woman stepped into contemporary society as women reached high powered job positions, which previously were intended to men. With the help of an empowering self-presentation such as power suits, women were trying to break through the glass ceiling. The development of power dressing was pivotal in bringing to public visibility women in executive or business position. It served as a way to construct their image and to make them recognizable at public society's eyes. 
Women saw this new clothing style as way to detach from the classical feminine meaning of fashion, mainly associated with aesthetics and frivolity.

Power dressing locates power at body level giving a message about women and their profession, enclosing at the same time something about self-esteem and confidence.

Sexuality
One of the main purposes of power dressing was to reduce the female body's sexuality to gain authority in the workplace. According to Entwistle, in western culture female dress is considered to be more sexual than male dress. The feminine body has historically been associated with nature, nurturing, and reproduction, something that can be problematic in most workplaces, where manifesting such sexuality is considered inappropriate.

According to some sociologists and psychologists, the primary function by which most women choose clothes and accessories is to look sexually appealing so that they may attract a partner. Feminists and even Freud have spoken out against this theory, since it has been well observed that both men and women take pleasure in being looked at by others, as well as take pleasure in looking at others, in a sexual context. However, it is only the female body which remains overly sexualized culturally.

Power dressing thus attempts to counterbalance a woman's natural femininity and inherent sexuality, with the goal of preventing the sexual misinterpretation through her clothes that might otherwise allow.

In the media

Icons

Power dressing, as a new fashion phenomenon, has its symbols in public figures such as Margaret Thatcher, Hillary Clinton, Michelle Obama and many more. Margaret Thatcher above all was one of the first to incorporate the spirit of power suits and had a "reputation as the original female power-dresser". Her personal style was, according to Vogue, reinvented following Molloy's suggestions in order to make her appearance appropriate for the role of Prime Minister.

Margaret Thatcher's style sets the rules on how female politicians should dress, which is a conservative, powerful but simultaneously feminine way. 
Her typical power suits consisted in a skirt suit with wide shoulder, a pussy-bow blouse and the Asprey handbag, which, thanks to her, became famous. Her signature style was to be expressed in the very famous pearl necklace. She was able to pave the way for all those careers-motivated women who were trying to succeed in a male dominated world and like her, they could find support in clothes and accessories to communicate authority and power.
Hillary Clinton is a contemporary icon of power dressing: with her pantsuits she is a follower of the Thatcher style.

Television shows
Main references to power dressing in popular culture are to be found in 1980's soap operas such as Dallas (1978–1991) and Dynasty (1981–1989). 
In these TV series typical elements of power dressing, such as padded shoulders and costume jewelry, are easily recognizable. 
In Dallas, together with the typical features of power dressing more bright colors were to be seen. This TV show contributed to the return of strong colors, like fuchsia pinks, sea greens, purples, royal blue and red in a women's wardrobe. Also women's fashion and business shoes were revisited during that period, changing the pointed toes and spiked heels, popular in the 1950s and early 1960s, with some fashion shoes covered with white satin or canvas and dyed to the customer's favorite color.

Films
Working Girl: In this movie power dressing is embodied in the figures of Katherine, the superboss, and Tess, the secretary.
Katherine symbolizes a model of business elegance in mid-grey collarless silk jacket with padded shoulders. Her style shows important features of power dressing, but she also wears vivid red dresses, symbol of power and respect.
Tess is stylistically the opposite. She adapts power dressing to her personal style making it more feminine. For instance during a business cocktail meeting, Tess wears a long black sparkly dress and a dark brown fur coat, attracting people's attention. Tess is "the first woman […] that dresses like a woman, not like a woman would think a man would dress if he was a woman". On the contrary, the other secretaries in the movie have a different style. They appear as young and energetic girls and their clothes are the example of some quite bad taste outfits, including leopard skin print jackets, black stripe tights and copious baggy leather outerwear, often worn with gaudy hoop earrings or all gold accessories.

The Iron Lady: The movie tells the story of the British politician and icon of power dressing Margaret Thatcher. Starting from her youth and going through all her life, it shows her transformation to become the first British female prime minister.

See also

 1980s in fashion
 Shoulder pads (fashion)

References

Bibliography
 Akbari, Anna (2008). Fashioning Power: Visual Self-presentation in Social Life. The New School for Social Research. Dissertation for the degree of Doctor of Philosophy.
 Entwistle, J. (2000). The Fashioned Body: Fashion, Dress and Modern Social Theory. Polity Press. .
 Koda, Bolton, Saillard, Garelick (2005). Chanel. Metropolitan Museum of Art. .
 John T. Molloy (1975). New Dress for Success. Warner Books. .
 John T. Molloy (1980). New Women's Dress for Success. Business Plus. .
 Nava, Blake, MacRury, Richards (1996). Buy This Book: Studies in Advertising and Consumption. Routledge. . 
 Wilson, E. (2003). Adorned in Dreams: Fashion and Modernity. London: Virago. .

1980s fashion
Organizational culture